Natasha ( / Nataša) is a 2001 Yugoslav drama film directed by Ljubiša Samardžić. It was the first film to use the overthrow of Slobodan Milošević as a backdrop for its story.

Cast 
 Tijana Kondić - Natasa
 Nikola Đuričko - Marko
 Anica Dobra - Sandra
 Davor Janjić - Kiza
 Dragan Bjelogrlić - Aca
 Neda Arnerić - Biljana (Natasina majka)
 Boris Milivojević - Jezdimir Vasiljevic - Dzeni
 Zoran Cvijanović - Milutin

References

External links 

2001 drama films
2001 films
Films set in Serbia
Serbian drama films
Films about the Serbian Mafia
Cultural depictions of Slobodan Milošević
2000s Serbian-language films